David Ostrosky Vinograd (born  December 1, 1956) is a Mexican actor, active since 1984.

Early life 
Ostrosky was born in Mexico, and is of Jewish descent. His father, Pedro Ostrosky, is Lithuanian Jewish from Kyiv, Ukraine, and his mother Gueña Vinograd is from Poland.

Career
He is known for his moustache, and for appearing in numerous telenovelas, and plays in Mexico City.

Telenovelas
Vencer la ausencia (2022) as Homero Funes
La Casa de las Flores (2018) as Dr. Salomón Cohen
Hasta el fin del mundo (2014) as Maestro Coria
Por Siempre mi Amor (2013) as Gilberto Cervantes
Porque el Amor Manda (2012-2013) as Lic. Astudillo
Un Refugio para el Amor (2012) as Claudio
Una familia con suerte (2011) as Ernesto Quesada
Cuando me enamoro (2011) as Benjamín Casillas
Soy tu dueña (2010) as Moisés Macotela
Alma de hierro (2009) as Alonso
En nombre del amor (2008) as Dr. Rodolfo Bermúdez
Central de abastos (2008) as Jimena’s father
Destilando Amor (2007) as Eduardo Saldívar
Duelo de Pasiones (2006) as Elías Bernal
Alborada (2005) as Agustín de Corsa
Amy, la nińa de la mochila azul (2004) as Sebastián Hinojosa
Bajo la misma piel (2003) as Jaime Sandoval
¡Vivan los niños! (2002) as Dr. Bernardo Arias
El juego de la vida (2001) as Rafael
Sin pecado concebido (2001) as Enrique
El derecho de nacer (2001) as José Rivera
La casa en la playa (2000) as César Villareal
Carita de angel (2000) as Dr. Velasco
El diario de Daniela (1999) as Gustavo Corona
Alguna vez tendremos alas (1997) as Dr. Ricardo Aguilera
El secreto de Alejandra (1997) as Rubén
La antorcha encendida (1996) as Mariano Abasolo
Marisol (1996) as Mariano
Agujetas de color de rosa (1994) as Víctor Manuel
Valentina (1993) as Diego
María Mercedes (1992) as Dr. Muñoz
Alcanzar una estrella II (1991) as Roberto
Simplemente Maria (1989) as Rodrigo de Peñalvert
Teresa (1989) as Willy
Rosa Salvaje (1987) as Carlos
Principessa (1984) as Juan Carlos

Films
La segunda noche (1999) as Saul
Like Water for Chocolate (1992) as Juan de la Garza
Triste recuerdo (1990) as Maria’s husband
My Mexican Shivah

Plays/Theatre

Piaf (2015/2016) as Louis Barriere

References 

1956 births
Living people
Mexican male film actors
Mexican male telenovela actors
Mexican male television actors
Mexican Jews
Mexican people of Jewish descent
Mexican people of Polish-Jewish descent
Mexican people of Ukrainian-Jewish descent
Male actors from Mexico City